Ayalurpuzha River is one of the tributaries of the river Gayathripuzha. Gayathripuzha is one of the main tributaries of the  Bharathapuzha River, the second-longest river in Kerala, South India.

Other tributaries of the river Gayathripuzha
Mangalam river
Vandazhippuzha
Meenkarappuzha
Chulliyar

Bharathappuzha